In 2016 SA's Got Talent returned for another season. Tol Ass Mo was named new host. DJ Fresh and Shado Twala returned to the judging panel and a new judge, Jamie Bartlett, was added to the judging panel.

Changes 
 A new host was introduced. The new host was South African comedian, Tol Ass Mo.
 A new judge was introduced. The new judge replacing Lalla Hirayama, was South African actor, Jamie Bartlett.
 A new producers of SABC 3's talk show, Trending SA, is 10-Speed TV Pictures.

Auditions

Open Auditions

Judges auditions 
Acts who were accepted in the open auditions, make it through to the judges audition, where it is televised with a live audience.
For the judges auditions, there are 5 episodes where hundreds of acts are put through to have a chance to get to the next round – the semifinals, although only 21 acts will get through.

Semifinals
There are 3 episodes in the semifinal part of this competition. Each episode consists of 7 acts. There are also 3 result episodes in which 2 acts from each episode are put through to the finals.

Semi finalist summary

Semi Final 1 

Result show guest: Matthew Mole

Semi Final 2 

Result show guest: Fifi Cooper

Semi Final 3 

Result show guest: Aewon Wolf and Moonchild

Finals 

6 acts are put through to the finals with 1 winner, ultimately, that wins the grand prize of R500 000.

Result show guest: Kwesta

Episode summary

References 

Got Talent
2016 South African television seasons